Charles W. Jarvis is the chairman and CEO of USANext, formerly known as the United Seniors Association. He joined the group in 2001.

Charles served as deputy under secretary at the Department of the Interior during the Ronald Reagan and George H. W. Bush administrations.  He was legislative director for Senator Charles Grassley (R-Iowa).

Jarvis was campaign chairman for presidential candidate Gary Bauer in 2000.  He resigned the position, and as stated in Christianity Today: "Charles Jarvis, Bauer's former campaign chairman, and Tim McDonald, former chief of advance operations, said they resigned from Bauer's campaign because they felt that Bauer was fostering the appearance of sexual impropriety by meeting and traveling alone with the deputy manager."  He later became an adviser to Steve Forbes in his run for president.

Jarvis was also the executive vice president of Focus on the Family.  Additionally, he is a member of the Council for National Policy, another political Christian organization. He also sits on the national advisory board of For Our Grandchildren a group promoting U.S. Social Security privatization.

External links
New York Times New York Times Q&A with Charles Jarvis
USA Next : Biography of Charles Jarvis
Council for National Policy : 1998 Roster List
Christianity Today : Jarvis Resigned from Bauer Campaign
Jarvis Declares Support for Forbes : Capital Briefs
Glen Justice, "A New Target for Advisers to Swift Vets," New York Times, February 21, 2005.
Public Citizen : United Seniors Association: Hired Guns for PhRMA and Other Corporate Interests - July 2002 Report
StealthPac.org : Selected Affiliations of Charles Jarvis

American civil servants
American chief executives
Living people
Year of birth missing (living people)